Matilde Raspa Mastrangi (born 18 March 1953 in São Paulo, Brazil) is a Brazilian actress.

Career 
Mastrangi was originally a photomodel who also posed for the magazine Sétimo Céu. In 1971, singer Wanderley Cardoso arranged her to work as a dancer on Silvio Santos TV show.

Mastrangi made her acting debut in 1974 with As Cangaceiras Eróticas, an erotic comedy by Roberto Mauro. She continued her acting career with films like Bacalhau (1976). She became a popular figure of pornochanchadas and during these years, she was considered as one of the most important actresses of the genre along with Helena Ramos and Aldine Müller.

After the fading of pornochanchada in popularity, she passed to other genres, including all films directed by Guilherme de Almeida Prado such as Perfume de Gardênia.

She posed for February 1984 issue of Playboy Brasil.

Personal life 
Mastrangi is married to actor Oscar Magrini whom she met during the shooting of Uma Ilha Para Três, in 1980. The couple have a daughter named Isabella and live in Atibaia.

References 

Living people
1953 births
Brazilian film actresses
Brazilian female models
Brazilian female dancers
Actresses from São Paulo
Brazilian people of Italian descent
People from Atibaia